Ruth 2 is the second chapter of the Book of Ruth in the Hebrew Bible (where it is part of the Ketuvim) and in the Old Testament of the Christian Bible. This chapter contains the story of Ruth gleaning in the fields of Boaz, her deceased husband's near kinsman, and he notices her, Ruth 2:1-7; Boaz shows her great kindness, and blesses her, Ruth 2:8-16; Ruth brings what she got to Naomi; and tells her about Boaz; Naomi gives God thanks, and exhorts Ruth to continue in the field, Ruth 2:17-23.

Text
The original text was written in Biblical Hebrew. This chapter is divided into 23 verses.

Textual versions
Some early witnesses for the text of this chapter in Biblical Hebrew are of the Masoretic Text, which includes the Aleppo Codex (10th century) and Codex Leningradensis (1008). Some fragments containing parts of this chapter were found among the Dead Sea Scrolls, i.e., 2Q16 (2QRutha; ~50 CE) with extant verses 13‑23, with only slight variations from the Masoretic Text.

There is also a translation into Koine Greek known as the Septuagint, made in the last few centuries BC. Extant ancient manuscripts of the Septuagint version include Codex Vaticanus (B; B; 4th century), Codex Alexandrinus (A; A; 5th century).

Verse 1
 There was a relative of Naomi’s husband, a man of great wealth, of the family of Elimelech. His name was Boaz.
 "A relative of Naomi's husband (KJV: "a kinsman of her husband's": from the Ketiv reading מְיֻדַּע ({{Strong-number|mō-w-ḏa|H|03045}}; absolute מְיֻדָע) which is much preferred than the Qere מודַע, although מְיֻדָּע is ambiguous with primary meaning "known, well-known, acquainted", i.e., an "acquaintance" (see ;). Such "intimate acquaintances" are usually among the members of the family clan ('kinsfolk'), the word here may be used in reference to a 'kinsman'. The Vulgate translates it consanguineus which is interpretatively correct. With the original term being less definite, the appended clause, "of the family or clan of Elimelech," is not quite redundant. The "next kinsman" of Ruth 2:20, etc. גאל gā'al, is a completely different word. A tradition states that Boaz's father was Elimelech's brother.
 "A man of great wealth" (KJV: "a mighty man of wealth"): also of great power and authority, as well as of great virtue and honor, all which the word "wealth" may signify; also the Targumist gives a paraphrase that "he was mighty in the law"; in the Scriptures, a religious man, which indicates his admirable character.
 "Boaz": Commonly taken to mean, "strength is in him" (compare ). Also the name of one of the pillars in Solomon's temple, indicating its "strength". Boaz was a grandson of Nahshon, the leader of the tribe of Judah during the Exodus, who first offered at the dedication of the altar, and his father was Salmon, while his mother was Rahab, the harlot of Jericho (Matthew 1:5). A somewhat detailed account of Boaz is presented, because he, with Ruth, makes the principal part of the subsequent narratives. There is a Jewish tradition considering him the same with Ibzan', a judge of Israel.

Verse 2

 So Ruth the Moabitess said to Naomi, "Please let me go to the field, and glean heads of grain after him in whose sight I may find favor." And she said to her, "Go, my daughter." "Ruth the Moabitess": the repetitive designation "the Moabitess" for Ruth indicates the particularization of this legal phraseology. Despite noted as a foreigner, Ruth was willing and wishful to be accept an Israelitish grace for the poor, the privilege of gleaning after the reapers in the harvest-fields (see ;). Such gleaning could have been a humiliation to those who had been in good life, but Ruth saw the serious difficulty in survival of her mother-in-law, so despite the possible temptation as well as humiliation, she resolved to work during the whole harvest season to gather their own food as much as possible to support their life.
 "Let me now go to the field": After some time at Bethlehem, not long into the barley harvest, before it was over, Ruth asked Naomi permission to go to the field, as she did not choose to do anything without her advice and consent. She desired to go to the field which belonged to Bethlehem, which seems to have been an open field, not enclosed, where each inhabitant had his part, including Boaz, (Ruth 2:3) and it being harvest time the field was full of people.
 "Glean": The right of gleaning was given according to a positive law on the widow, the poor, and the stranger ( and ). However, the liberty to glean behind the reapers (Ruth 2:3) was not a right that could be claimed; it was a privilege granted or refused according to the owner's good will or favor.

Verse 3
 Then she left, and went and gleaned in the field after the reapers. And she happened to come to the part of the field belonging to Boaz, who was of the family of Elimelech."Then she left, and went" (KJV: "And she went, and came"): That is, she went out of the house, then went out of the city, and came into the field, while, according to the Midrash, marking the ways she took, before she arrived at the field, so she would follow the marks and signs she made to come home.
 "And she happened" (KJV "and her hap"): "And it so happened." directed by providence of God, though it seems to be a "hap and chance" to her, what people say as 'good luck'.
 "A part of the field belonging to Boaz": as fields in Palestine are unenclosed, the phrase indicates that this portion of the open ground lays within the landmarks of Boaz.
"The family of Elimelech" (KJV: "the kindred of Elimelech"): see Ruth 2:1.

Verse 4
 And, behold, Boaz came from Bethlehem, and said unto the reapers, The Lord be with you. And they answered him, The Lord bless thee.Verse 4 in Hebrew
Masoretic text
 והנה־בעז בא מבית לחם ויאמר לקוצרים
 יהוה עמכם
 ויאמרו לו
 יברכך יהוה׃

Transliteration
 wə-   mib-, wa- la-
  ;
 wa- lōw
  .

Verse 4 notes
The civilities of intercourse between proprietors and their laborers are common in the East. Modern Moslems are particular in the matter of salutations.

Verse 23

 So she stayed close by the young women of Boaz, to glean until the end of barley harvest and wheat harvest; and she dwelt with her mother-in-law.''
 "So she stayed close by the young women of Boaz" (KJV: "So she kept fast by the maidens of Boaz to glean"): or "And she kept close by Boaz's young women to glean". Wright translates thus: "And she kept gleaning along with the maidens of Boaz." The maidens of Boaz are not represented as gleaning, but the statement of the verse is to be connected to the hortatory statement of verse 8: "Keep close to my young women."
 "Till the end of the barley-harvest and the wheat-harvest": the Midrash notes a period of 3 months from the beginning of the barley harvest, to the end of the wheat harvest, though it could be sooner; thus from the Passover to Pentecost were seven weeks, which was the difference between the beginning of one harvest, and the beginning of the other.
 "Dwelt with her mother-in-law": The Vulgate combines this clause with the next verse, and renders it, "After she returned to her mother-in-law," pointing the verb thus וַתָּשָׁב instead of וַתֵּשֶׁב. The same translation of the verb is rendered by Luther and Coverdale. There is no evidence that Ruth slept anywhere else than under her mother-in-law's roof. The clause was apparently written to emphasize Ruth's stainless innocence, sweet simplicity, and never-tiring devotion to her mother-in-law.

See also

Related Bible parts: Leviticus 19, Deuteronomy 24, Ruth 1

Notes

References

Bibliography

External links

Jewish
Ruth 2 Hebrew with Parallel English
Ruth 2 Hebrew with Rashi's Commentary

Christian
Ruth 2 English Translation with Parallel Latin Vulgate

02